Sep. 10 - Eastern Orthodox liturgical calendar - Sep. 12

All fixed commemorations below celebrated on September 24 by Orthodox Churches on the Old Calendar.

For September 11th, Orthodox Churches on the Old Calendar commemorate the Saints listed on August 29.

Saints
 Martyrs Demetrius, his wife Evanthia, and their son Demetrian, at Skepsis on the Hellespont (1st century) 
 Martyrs Serapion, Cronides (Hieronides), and Leontius, of Alexandria (237)  (see also: September 13)
 Martyr Ia of Persia and 9,000 martyrs of Persia under Shapur II with her (362-364)  (see also: September 10, August 4, August 11)
 Martyrs Diodorus, Didymus, and Diomedes of Laodicea (362-364)
 Saint Paphnutius the Confessor, Bishop in the Egyptian Thebaid (4th century)  (see also: March 27)
 Venerable Theodora of Alexandria (491)
 Saint Euphrosynus the Cook of Alexandria (9th century)
 Venerable Elias the Cave-dweller of Calabria (Elia Speleota), and his spiritual father St. Arsenios (c. 960)
 Holy Martyr Theodora of Vasta, in the central Peloponnese (10th century)

Pre-Schism Western saints
 Saint Protus and Hyacinth, by tradition brothers, they were both servants and were martyred in Rome (c. 257)
 Saints Felix and Regula, brother and sister, martyred near Zurich (3rd century)
 Saint Patiens of Lyon, Archbishop of Lyons in France (c. 491)
 Saint Emilian, a hermit for forty years, he became Bishop of Vercelli in Piedmont in Italy, where he reposed a centenarian (520)
 Saint Vincent of León, Abbot of St Claudius in León in Spain, he was martyred by the Arian Visigoths (c. 554)
 Saint Almirus (Almer, Almire), born in Auvergne in France, he finally went to live as a hermit at Gréez-sur-Roc, where he reposed (c. 560)
 Saint Deiniol, Abbot and first Bishop of Bangor, Wales (584)
 Saint Adelphus, grandson of St Romaricus and his successor as Abbot of Remiremont Abbey in the east of France (c. 670)
 Saint Bodo (Leudinus), Bishop of Toul (c. 670)

Post-Schism Orthodox saints
 Venerable Silouan the Athonite, Elder, of St. Panteleimon Monastery, Mt. Athos (1938)  (see also: September 24)
 Saint John, Abbot, of Svyatogorsk Monastery (1970)

New martyrs and confessors
 Hieromartyrs Nicholas Podyakov and Victor Usov, Priests (1918)
 Hieromartyr Carp Elba, Priest (1937)
 Hieromartyr Nicholas Shirogorov, Deacon (1942)

Other commemorations
 Translation of relics of Sergius and Herman, Wonder-workers of Valaam Monastery (1542-1550)
 Weeping Kazan Icon of the Most Holy Theotokos "of Kaplunovka" (1689)
 Glorification of St. Xenia of Saint Petersburg, Fool-for-Christ (1978)
 Synaxis of the Saints of the Svatogorsk Monastery.
 Repose of the young Elder Melchizedek of Mzensk (1846)

Icon gallery

Notes

References

Sources
 September 11/September 24. Orthodox Calendar (PRAVOSLAVIE.RU).
 September 24 / September 11. HOLY TRINITY RUSSIAN ORTHODOX CHURCH (A parish of the Patriarchate of Moscow).
 September 11. OCA - The Lives of the Saints.
 The Autonomous Orthodox Metropolia of Western Europe and the Americas (ROCOR). St. Hilarion Calendar of Saints for the year of our Lord 2004. St. Hilarion Press (Austin, TX). p. 68.
 The Eleventh Day of the Month of September. Orthodoxy in China.
 September 11. Latin Saints of the Orthodox Patriarchate of Rome.
 The Roman Martyrology. Transl. by the Archbishop of Baltimore. Last Edition, According to the Copy Printed at Rome in 1914. Revised Edition, with the Imprimatur of His Eminence Cardinal Gibbons. Baltimore: John Murphy Company, 1916. pp. 279–280.
 Rev. Richard Stanton. A Menology of England and Wales, or, Brief Memorials of the Ancient British and English Saints Arranged According to the Calendar, Together with the Martyrs of the 16th and 17th Centuries. London: Burns & Oates, 1892. pp. 445–446.

 Greek Sources
 Great Synaxaristes:  11 ΣΕΠΤΕΜΒΡΙΟΥ. ΜΕΓΑΣ ΣΥΝΑΞΑΡΙΣΤΗΣ.
  Συναξαριστής. 11 Σεπτεμβρίου. ECCLESIA.GR. (H ΕΚΚΛΗΣΙΑ ΤΗΣ ΕΛΛΑΔΟΣ).
  11/09/. Ορθόδοξος Συναξαριστής.

 Russian Sources
  24 сентября (11 сентября). Православная Энциклопедия под редакцией Патриарха Московского и всея Руси Кирилла (электронная версия). (Orthodox Encyclopedia - Pravenc.ru).
  11 сентября по старому стилю  /  24 сентября по новому стилю. Русская Православная Церковь - Православный церковный календарь на  год.

September in the Eastern Orthodox calendar